Dusk is the fourth studio album by The The. It was recorded in 1992 and released by Sony Records on 25 January 1993. The album peaked at No. 2 in the United Kingdom, and at No. 142 in the United States. In 2002 the album was reissued in remastered form on CD. It is the band's final album to feature guitarist Johnny Marr.

Cover art
The album's cover was designed by artist Andy Dog Johnson, Matt's brother.

Reception

Dusk received positive reviews. In the NME, Terry Staunton wrote, "It can be a struggle at first, as Johnson never lets up from his blacker-than-black world-view, but Dusk is a rich and hugely rewarding experience which draws you to its cold bosom again and again." In Melody Maker David Bennun observed that it was "a remarkably straightforward album" for Johnson and wrote, "Like Nick Cave, Johnson protects himself from the ridicule he invites with bombastic self-caricature. When he lets this slip, he's left with an album that, although frequently absorbing, is still as inherently laughable as any The The album. Dusk needs time to grow; it deserves it. But while it takes it, the Dogs of Lust are closing in, howling with mirth." Sam Samuelson of AllMusic declared it one of Johnson's "most accomplished products to date." "Slow Emotion Replay" was the 94th best-selling single in Iceland.

Track listing
Tracks written by Matt Johnson.

 "True Happiness This Way Lies" – 3:10
 "Love Is Stronger than Death" – 4:38
 "Dogs of Lust" – 3:09
 "This Is the Night" – 3:50
 "Slow Emotion Replay" – 3:55
 "Helpline Operator" – 4:48
 "Sodium Light Baby" – 3:45
 "Lung Shadows" – 4:34
 "Bluer Than Midnight" – 3:43
 "Lonely Planet" – 5:27

Personnel
 Matt Johnson – lead vocals, electric guitar, acoustic guitar, keyboards
 Johnny Marr – electric guitar, acoustic guitar, harmonica, backing vocals
 James Eller – bass guitar
 David Palmer – drums
 D. C. Collard – keyboards
 Vinnie Colaiuta – drums
 Bruce Smith – drums
Danny Thompson – upright bass on "This Is the Night"
 John Thirkle – trumpet on "Helpline Operator"
 David Lawrence – flugelhorn on "Lung Shadows"
 Ashley Slater – trombone on "Lung Shadows"
 Chris Batchelor – trumpet on "Lung Shadows"
 Guy Barker – trumpet on "Bluer Than Midnight"
 Paul Webb, Zeke Manyika – chorus on "Lonely Planet"

Charts

Notes

The The albums
1993 albums